In anatomy, arterial tree is used to refer to all arteries and/or the branching pattern of the arteries. This article regards the human arterial tree. Starting from the aorta:

the following are the parts

Ascending aorta 
It is a portion of the aorta commencing at the upper part of the base of the left ventricle, on a level with the lower border of the third costal cartilage behind the left half of the sternum.

Right coronary artery 
posterior interventricular artery (mostly)
SA nodal artery (in 60%)
Right marginal artery

Left coronary artery 
anterior interventricular
septal
diagonal
circumflex
SA nodal artery (in 40%)
posterior interventricular artery (occasionally)
Left marginal arteries
posterolateral artery
ramus intermedius (sometimes)

Aortic arch

brachiocephalic artery 
right common carotid artery
right subclavian artery

left common carotid artery (directly from arch of aorta on left mostly)

internal carotid artery 

ophthalmic artery
Orbital group
 Lacrimal artery
lateral palpebral arteries
zygomatic branches
recurrent branch
 Supraorbital artery
superficial branch
 deep branch
 Posterior ethmoidal artery
meningeal branch
 nasal branches
 Anterior ethmoidal artery
anterior meningeal artery
 nasal branches
 superior palpebral arch
 inferior palpebral arch
 Supratrochlear artery
 Dorsal nasal artery
twig to the upper part of lacrimal sac
to root of nose
dorsum of the nose
Ocular group
 Long posterior ciliary arteries
Circulus arteriosus major
Circulus arteriosus minor
 Short posterior ciliary arteries
 Anterior ciliary artery
 Central retinal artery
 Muscular artery
anterior cerebral artery
middle cerebral artery
anterolateral central arteries
internal striate
external striate
posterior communicating artery

external carotid artery 

 Arising in carotid triangle
 Superior thyroid artery
 Hyoid (infrahyoid) artery
 Sternocleidomastoid artery
 Superior laryngeal artery
 Cricothyroid artery
 Ascending pharyngeal artery
 Lingual artery
 Facial artery
 cervical
 Ascending palatine artery
 Tonsillar branch
 Submental artery
superficial branch
deep branch
 Glandular branches
 facial
 Inferior labial artery
 Superior labial artery
 Lateral nasal branch
 Angular artery - the terminal branch
 Occipital artery
 Posterior auricular artery
 Terminal branches
 Maxillary artery
First portion
 Deep auricular artery
 Anterior tympanic artery
 Middle meningeal artery
anterior and posterior
ophthalmic artery (very rarely)
superior tympanic artery
vessels to semilunar ganglion
superficial petrosal branch
Orbital branches
Temporal branches
 Inferior alveolar artery
incisor branch
mental branch
lingual branch
mylohyoid branch
 Accessory meningeal artery
Second portion
 Masseteric artery
 Pterygoid branches
 Deep temporal arteries (anterior and posterior)
 Buccal artery
Third portion
 Sphenopalatine artery, terminal branch
 posterior lateral nasal branches
 posterior septal branches
 Descending palatine artery
greater palatine artery
lesser palatine arteries
 Infraorbital artery
orbital branches
anterior superior alveolar arteries
 Posterior superior alveolar artery
branches to alveolar canals
branches to gingiva
 Pharyngeal artery
 Artery of pterygoid canal
 Superficial temporal artery
Transverse facial artery
Middle temporal artery
Anterior auricular branch
frontal branch
parietal branch

Left subclavian artery (directly from arch of aorta on left)

vertebral artery 

Meningeal branches of vertebral artery
Posterior spinal artery
ascending branch
descending branch
Anterior spinal artery
Posterior inferior cerebellar artery
medial branch
lateral branch
Basilar artery
Anterior inferior cerebellar artery
labyrinthine artery
pontine branches

internal thoracic artery 

 Mediastinal branches
 Thymic branches
 Pericardiophrenic artery
 Sternal branches
 Perforating branches
 six anterior intercostal branches
 upper branches
 lower branches of the space anastomoses
Musculophrenic artery
intercostal branches (three)
branches to lower part of the pericardium
branches to diaphragm
branches to abdominal muscles
Superior epigastric artery

thyrocervical trunk 

inferior thyroid artery
suprascapular artery
transverse cervical artery
Superficial branch
Deep branch/Dorsal scapular artery (sometimes)

costocervical trunk 

Deep cervical artery
Supreme intercostal artery
1st and 2nd posterior intercostal artery

Axillary artery

Superior thoracic artery
Thoracoacromial artery
acromial
pectoral
clavicular
deltoid
Lateral thoracic artery
Subscapular artery
Anterior humeral circumflex artery
Posterior humeral circumflex artery

Brachial artery

Profunda brachii artery
radial collateral artery
medial collateral artery
branches to the deltoid muscle
Superior ulnar collateral artery
Posterior ulnar recurrent artery
Inferior ulnar collateral artery
Ascending branches
Descending branches
radial artery
radial branches in the forearm
 Radial recurrent artery
 Palmar carpal branch of radial artery
 Superficial palmar branch of the radial artery
radial branches at the wrist
 Dorsal carpal branch of radial artery
 First dorsal metacarpal artery
radial branches in the hand
 Princeps pollicis artery
 Radialis indicis
 Deep palmar arch
ulnar artery
anterior ulnar recurrent artery
posterior ulnar recurrent artery
common interosseous artery
posterior interosseous artery
interosseous recurrent artery
anterior interosseous artery
muscular branches
nutrient arteries of radius and ulna
branch to volar carpal network
muscular artery
volar carpal
palmar carpal arch
dorsal carpal
dorsal carpal arch
deep volar
superficial volar arch

Thoracic aorta 

bronchial arteries
esophageal arteries
mediastinal branches
Lower 9(3rd to 11th) posterior intercostal arteries
subcostal arteries
superior phrenic arteries

Abdominal aorta

inferior phrenic

celiac
left gastric artery
hepatic branch
oesophageal branch
common hepatic artery
proper hepatic artery
Terminal branches
right hepatic artery
Cystic artery
left hepatic artery
right gastric artery
gastroduodenal artery
right gastro-omental artery
superior pancreaticoduodenal artery
splenic artery
dorsal pancreatic artery
short gastric arteries
left gastro-omental artery
Bühler's anastomotic artery

superior mesenteric 
inferior pancreaticoduodenal artery
middle colic artery
right colic artery
intestinal arteries
ileocolic artery

middle suprarenal

renal

Anterior and posterior

interlobar artery 
arcuate artery
interlobular artery
afferent arteriole
efferent arteriole
descending vasa recta
peritubular capillaries

gonadal 
testicular artery in males
ovarian artery in females

lumbar

inferior mesenteric 
left colic artery
ascending branch
descending branch
sigmoid arteries
superior rectal artery

median sacral

common iliac

Common iliac arteries

Internal iliac artery

Anterior division 
obturator artery
superior vesical artery
Vaginal artery (females) / inferior vesical artery (males)
middle rectal artery
internal pudendal artery
inferior rectal artery
perineal artery
posterior scrotal branches in males/posterior labial branches in females
urethral artery
artery of bulb of penis in males / artery of bulb of vestibule in females
dorsal artery of penis in males / dorsal artery of clitoris in females
deep artery of penis in males / deep artery of clitoris in females
inferior gluteal artery
Accompanying artery of ischiadic nerve
Uterine artery (females) / deferential artery (males)
Vaginal artery (sometimes)
(obliterated) umbilical artery

Posterior division 
iliolumbar artery
Lumbar branch
Iliac branch
lateral sacral artery
Superior
Inferior
superior gluteal artery
Superficial branch
Deep branch

external iliac artery 
Inferior epigastric artery
Deep circumflex iliac artery
femoral artery
superficial epigastric artery
Superficial circumflex iliac artery
Superficial external pudendal artery
Deep external pudendal artery
Deep femoral artery
Lateral femoral circumflex artery
ascending branch
descending branch
transverse branch
Medial femoral circumflex artery
ascending branch
descending branch
superficial branch
deep branch
acetabular branch
Perforating arteries
first perforating artery
second perforating artery
third/fourth perforating artery
Descending genicular artery
Saphenous branch
Musculo-articular branch

Popliteal artery 
anterior tibial artery
post. tibial recurrent artery
ant. tibial recurrent artery
muscular branches
anterior medial malleolar artery
anterior lateral malleolar artery
Dorsalis pedis artery
posterior tibial artery
fibular artery (sometimes from popliteal artery)
communicating branch to the anterior tibial artery
perforating branch to the posterior tibial artery
medial plantar artery
lateral plantar artery
sural artery
medial superior genicular artery
Branch to vastus medialis
Branch to surface of the femur and the knee-joint
lateral superior genicular artery
superficial branch
deep branch
middle genicular artery
medial inferior genicular artery
branch to popliteus
lateral inferior genicular artery

See also 
Family tree of major arteries

References 

   
 

Arteries